Aimé Rosso (born 5 June 1955) is a French former professional footballer who played as a forward. He played for Monaco and Tours.

Honours 
Monaco

 Coupe de France runner-up: 1973–74

References 

1955 births
Living people
People from Saint-Tropez
Sportspeople from Var (department)
French footballers
Association football forwards
AS Monaco FC players
Tours FC players

Ligue 1 players
Ligue 2 players
Footballers from Provence-Alpes-Côte d'Azur